"Yume Monogatari" is Tackey & Tsubasa's second single under the avex trax label. This is the second retail single for their 2wenty 2wo album.

Overview
"" is the second single released by Japanese pop duo Tackey & Tsubasa. The a-side song "Yume Monogatari" was used as the Olympus "μDigital" commercial song. The b-side "Kaze no Uta" was used as House Commodity "Dongari Corn" commercial song. The other b-side "It's Only Dream" was TBS TV "Golden Muscle" ending theme song. To add to that, the last b-side, which is "Hitonatsu no..." was used as TBS TV "USO!? Japan" ending theme song.

Sample of the translated lyrics:
You are a flower of love, I am a flower of romance
Seizing time, shaking
A tale of the moon, a tale of the stars, I continued to pray
You are a trap of love, I am a trap of romance; seizing everything, we'll sleep
A tale of the wind, a tale of a dream, an illusion that won't fade

Track listing

Regular CD Format
 "" (Hitoshi Haba) - 4:31
 "" (Imai Tsubasa) (Sumiyo Mutsumi, UZA) - 4:37
 "It's Only Dream" (Takizawa Hideaki) (Ooyagi Hiroo, Mizue) - 4:54
 "" (Hideyuki Obata, Kousuke Morimoto) - 3:32
 "Yume Monogatari: karaoke" - 4:31

Limited CD Format
 "" (Hitoshi Haba) - 4:31
 "" (Imai Tsubasa) (Sumiyo Mutsumi, UZA) - 4:37
 "It's Only Dream" (Takizawa Hideaki) (Ooyagi Hiroo, Mizue) - 4:54
 "Yume Monogatari: Takizawa Part Version" - 4:31
 "Yume Monogatari: Tsubasa Part Version" - 4:31
 "Yume Monogatari: karaoke" - 4:31

Personnel
 Takizawa Hideaki - vocals
 Imai Tsubasa - vocals

Charts
Oricon Sales Chart (Japan)

RIAJ Certification
As of December 2003, "Yume Monogatari" has been certified gold for shipments of over 100,000 by the Recording Industry Association of Japan.

References 
 Translated Lyrics
 

Tackey & Tsubasa songs
2003 singles
Oricon Weekly number-one singles
2003 songs
Avex Trax singles